Moody and the Brass Figures is an album by saxophonist James Moody recorded in 1966 and released on the Milestone label.

Reception

Scott Yanow of Allmusic states, "Not content to be a mere bebop revivalist, Moody is heard throughout pushing himself".

Track listing 
All compositions by James Moody except as indicated
 "Smack-A-Mac" (Tom McIntosh) - 3:39  
 "Bess, You Is My Woman Now" (George Gershwin, DuBose Heyward) - 4:02  
 "Cherokee" (Ray Noble) - 3:50  
 "Love, Where Are You?" - 3:32  
 "The Moon Was Yellow" (Fred E. Ahlert, Edgar Leslie) - 4:30  
 "Au Privave" (Charlie Parker) - 3:53  
 "Ruby, My Dear" (Thelonious Monk) - 5:13  
 "Simplicity and Beauty" - 3:29  
 "Never Again" - 5:35

Personnel 
James Moody - tenor saxophone, flute
Snooky Young- trumpet (tracks 1, 2, 4, 6 & 8)
Joe Newman, Jimmy Owens - trumpet, flugelhorn (tracks 1, 2, 4, 6 & 8)
Jimmy Cleveland - trombone (tracks 1, 2, 4, 6 & 8)
Don Butterfield - tuba (tracks 1, 2, 4, 6 & 8)
Kenny Barron - piano
Bob Cranshaw - bass
Mel Lewis - drums
Tom McIntosh - arranger, conductor (tracks 1, 2, 4, 6 & 8)

References 

James Moody (saxophonist) albums
1963 albums
Milestone Records albums
Albums arranged by Tom McIntosh
Albums produced by Orrin Keepnews